A  is a traditional Japanese style of bedding.

Both elements of a futon bedding set are pliable enough to be folded and stored away in a large  during the day. This allows a room to serve as a bedroom at night, but serve other purposes during the day.

Traditionally, futons are used on tatami, a type of mat used as a flooring material. It also provides a softer base than, say, a floor of wood or stone. Futons must be aired regularly to prevent mold from developing, and to keep the futon free of mites. Throughout Japan, futons can commonly be seen hanging over balconies, airing in the sun. Futon dryers may be used by those unable to hang out their futon.

History and materials

Before recycled cotton cloth was widely available in Japan, commoners used , stitched crinkled paper stuffed with fibers from beaten dry straw, cattails, or silk waste, on  straw floor mats. Later, futons were made with patchwork recycled cotton, quilted together and filled with bast fiber. Later they were filled with cotton. Wool and synthetics are now also used.

 (よぎ, literally "nightclothes") are kimono-shaped bedclothes. They were used in the 1800s and early 1900s. Rectangular s are now widely used. s vary in materials; some are warmer than others. Those with traditional cotton filling feel heavier than those with feather or synthetic fillings.

Traditional  (まくら) are generally firmer than western pillows. They may be filled with beans, buckwheat chaff, bran, or, modernly, plastic beads, all of which mold to the head. Historically, some women used wooden headrests to protect their hairstyles.

Dimensions
Futons are traditionally laid on tatami rush mats, which are resilient and can absorb and re-release up to half a liter of moisture each. Tatamis measure 1 by 0.5 ken, just under 1 by 2 meters, the same size as a Western twin bed. A traditional  is also about the size of a Western twin bed. , double-bed-sized s were available, but they can be a bit heavy and awkward to stow.

A  is thus about as thick as a Western mattress topper. If more thickness is needed, s are layered.

s may be wider than s, and they vary in thickness. Depending on the weather, they may be layered with a warm , or replaced with a lighter .

The traditional  is usually smaller than a western pillow.

Western-style futons

In the 1980s, futons became fashionable in North America. The construction method was similar to that of contemporary Japanese futons: cotton batting, covered in cotton ticking and held in place with hand-sewn tufting (through-thickness stitches). This was also the structure that had been used in the United States' 1940-1941 Cotton Mattress Program, designed to use excess cotton production by subsidizing materials for people to make their own cotton mattresses.

However, Western-style futons, which typically resemble low, wooden sofa beds, differ considerably from their Japanese counterparts. They often have the dimensions of standard western mattresses, and are too thick to fold double and stow easily in a cupboard. They are often set up and stored on a slatted frame, which avoids having to move them to air regularly, especially in the dry indoor air of a centrally-heated house (most Japanese homes were not traditionally centrally-heated).

Futon-like traditional European beds

Traditional European beds resembled Japanese-style futon sets, with thin tick mattresses. These were only sometimes set on a bedframe. The term "bed" did not originally include the bedframe, but only the bedding, the same components included in a Japanese futon set.

It was also traditional to air these beds, and duvets are still aired in the window in Europe. In English-speaking cultures, however, airing bedding outdoors came to be seen as a foreign practice, with 19th-century housekeeping manuals giving methods of airing beds inside, and disparaging airing them in the window as "German-style".

See also
 Bed base, for a comparison with similar beds
 , a spirit-possessed boroboro 
 Day bed (bed used for other purposes during the day)
 Futon dryer, for airing futons when they can't be placed outside
 Housing in Japan, for cultural context
  (unit on which houses are traditionally built)
 Mattress topper (a type of thin Western mattress, similar to a futon)
 Tick mattress, futon-like European bedding
  (the type of rooms in which futons are frequently used)
  (sitting futon, a smaller cushion)

References

Beds
Couches
Japanese home
Mattresses
Portable furniture